Servicing may refer to:

 car servicing, a series of maintenance procedures carried out at a set time-interval or after the vehicle has travelled a certain distance
 computer maintenance
 loan servicing, the process by which a mortgage bank collects the timely payment of interest and principal from borrowers
 mortgage servicing, company to which some borrowers pay their mortgage loan payments and which performs other services

See also
 Service (disambiguation)
 Serving (disambiguation)